Stuart William Rudd (born 8 June 197?) is an Australian songwriter/bass guitar player of rock band, The Superjesus. The South Australia News reported that last March 3, 2017, Superjesus was inducted into the South Australia Hall of Fame at the Mortlock Library, State Library Building in Adelaide. Stuart Rudd and Sarah McLeod performed live. Australian guitarist John Brewster-Jones also played a solo rendition while the talented Baker Suite led by guitarist, soloist, and songwriter John Baker performed with the string quartet of Julian Ferraretto and The Yearlings.

Early life and family

Stuart Rudd grew up in Adelaide. His father was a drummer in a Scottish pipe band.

The Superjesus 
In late 1994 Rudd, together with Sarah McLeod (ex-Fallen Down Monster) (lead vocals, guitar), Paul Berryman (drums) and Chris Tennent (lead guitar) formed Hell's Kitchen in Adelaide. Rudd and Tennent had been jamming together for about a year before Rudd tried out for McLeod's latest band.

Hell's Kitchen changed their name to the Superjesus on the eve of the Big Day Out in Adelaide on Australia Day long-weekend, January 1996. In August 1996 the band released their debut EP, Eight Step Rail, which reached the ARIA Singles Chart Top 50 in the following February. At the 1997 ARIA Music Awards The Superjesus won Best New Talent for Eight Step Rail and Breakthrough Artist – Single for "Shut My Eyes".

In February 1998 they released their debut album, Sumo, which peaked at No. 2 on the ARIA Albums Chart and was certified platinum by ARIA for shipment of 70,000 copies. At the 1998 ARIA Music Awards the Superjesus were nominated for Best Group, Breakthrough Artist – Album and Best Cover Art.

The band released their second album, Jet Age, in October 2000, which peaked at No. 5 on the ARIA Albums Chart. Jet Age was nominated at the 2001 ARIA Music Awards, for Best Rock Album and Best Cover Art.

In May 2003 the Superjesus released their third album, Rock Music, which reached No. 14 on the ARIA Albums Chart. The first single from the album, "Stick Together", was co-written by Rudd and McLeod and peaked at No. 35 on the ARIA Singles Chart.

In June 2004 the Superjesus split following their 'Rock Music' tour. Rudd explained in a subsequent interview "We were having issues with our management, we were having issues with our record company. Internally within the band we weren't having a break and kept constantly working and working, we hadn't had a break for a long time and it just got to the point where we all thought we'll just take an extended break and see where we go with it, and it ended there.' He told Pearl Davies "Well it's not that we broke up at all, we just went home after a show, started to do other projects and just never seemed to get back to it. We probably could have put out a statement or something, woops."

Rudd toured as a member of Nick Barker & the Reptiles before joining, Southpoor, with Justin Garner (vocals, guitar) (ex-Nick Costa Band, Nick Barker & the Reptiles), Jad Green (drums), and Bill Rankine (guitar, vocals). On 1 December 2007 Southpoor released its debut album, What Doesn't Kill Ya..., on Mixmaster Records, with Barker and Mick Wordley co-producing. Rudd described his work outside of Superjesus, "I was doing the Nick Barker tour which was great fun! I went over and played some shows with him in Melbourne and also in Adelaide. I also have a band called [Southpoor] that is playing, and inbetween that I helped the Gels in the studio and producing their album as well."

The Superjesus reformed for a one-off reunion show in Adelaide on 1 February 2013. McLeod stating that it was Rudd who inspired the decision to reform. Rudd explained, "two or so years ago, Sarah [McLeod] and I were having breakfast and we thought about doing something again. We were both really keen on the idea and of course Paul [Berryman] was living overseas. In the meantime I did a few acoustic shows with Sarah which were great fun. I let it be known to the other guys on how much fun was had. So yeah, then Paul came back and it all kinda lined up you know, and in time for a 10 year reunion, so why not. At least we’re all back in Australia now and can do something together again. We have no management; we’re independent right now so it’s just the band. We have a publicist organising some stuff but other than that, we’re coordinating all the flights and everything. A big job." The band, subsequently performed at the Stone Music Festival with Van Halen and Aerosmith in Sydney in April, before embarking on their first national tour in 10 years – The Resurrection Tour – in May and June.

In early 2015 the Superjesus undertook a national tour with the Baby Animals. In June that year the Superjesus released their first single in over a decade, "The Setting Sun". In November they released a second single,  "St. Peters Lane", written by Rudd and McLeod, with Rudd writing the music in Adelaide and sending it to McLeod in Sydney to add the lyrics. Following the release of the single the band embarked on another national tour.

References

1970s births
Australian rock bass guitarists
Living people
The Superjesus members
Musicians from Adelaide
Year of birth uncertain